This article is about a comprehensive discography of Powerman 5000, an American rock band formed in 1991.

Studio albums

Compilation albums

Extended plays

Singles

Video albums

Music videos

Soundtrack contributions

References

Heavy metal group discographies
Discographies of American artists